Ricardo Ferreira da Silva (born 31 December 1986) commonly known as Ricardinho or Ricardinho Paraiba, is a Brazilian professional footballer who plays as a forward.

Club career

Santa Tecla 
Paraiba signed with Santa Tecla F.C. of the Salvadoran Primera División in 2013.

Paraiba scored a crucial goal in a 1–0 victory against Municipal Limeño in the first leg of the quarterfinals of the Apertura 2018 at the Estadio Jose Ramon Flores, in November 2018.

Honours

Club 
Santa Tecla F.C.
 Primera División
 Champion: Clausura 2015, Apertura 2016, Clausura 2017, Apertura 2018
 Runners-up: Apertura 2017, Clausura 2018

References

1986 births
Living people
Brazilian footballers
Clube Atlético Colatinense players
Estrela do Norte Futebol Clube players
Santa Tecla F.C. footballers
Brazilian expatriate footballers
Expatriate footballers in El Salvador
Brazilian expatriate sportspeople in El Salvador
Expatriate footballers in Iraq
Brazilian expatriate sportspeople in Iraq
Al-Mina'a SC players
Association football forwards